Inténtalo is the first studio album by Mexican group 3Ball MTY. It was released on December 6, 2011 under Fonovisa Records label.

Reception

Commercial performance 
Inténtalo became a commercial success for the trio. It debuted at No.2 on the Latin Albums chart the week ending 31 December 2011. The same week, it debuted atop the Regional Mexican Albums component chart. The album also appeared on the Billboard 200 at No.126 and on the Mexican Albums Chart at No.84.

Critical response 

David Jeffries from Allmusic gave a positive review of the album, and awarded it four stars out of five. On his review, he stated that "start with the outstanding title track for a taste and rest assured, the rest of the album is that good, and sometimes even better."

Jon Caramanica from The New York Times called Inténtalo "an album like none of the others" and commented that its music is "as nimble as ever, and as fleet, with chilling drums, winding samples, a robust sense of history and a keen urge to destroy and update it." The album earned the Lo Nuestro Award for Regional Mexican Album of the Year.

Track listing

Inténtalo 

"Inténtalo"  — 3:13
"Baile de Amor"  — 3:10
"Solos Tú y Yo"  — 3:02
"Tipsy"  — 3:23
"Ritmo Alterado" — 3:39
"Mala Mujer"  — 3:33
"Amantes Guaracheros" — 3:22
"Ese Ritmo" (Con Sabor) — 3:43
"Tu Carita"  — 3:38
"Te Digo Bye Bye"  — 3:03
"Besos al Aire"  — 3:48
"Todos a Bailar" — 3:46
"Tribal Guarachoso" — 3:09

Inténtalo (Deluxe Edition) 

"Hipsters Con Botas" — 3:17
"Inténtalo" (feat. América Sierra & El Bebeto) [Mijangos Remix] — 6:40
"Inténtalo" (feat. América Sierra & El Bebeto) [Dj Münki Remix] — 5:12

Personnel 

Oscar Botello - Composer
Alberto Del Castillo - A&R
Andrea Galván - Stylist
Toy Hernández - A&R
José Alberto Inzunza - Composer
Antonio Hernández Luna - Composer
Luciano Luna - Composer
Aaron "La Pantera" - Martínez Bajo Quinto
Milkman Botello - Stylist
Jose Serrano Montoya - Executive Producer
Horacio Palencia - Composer
Jorge Alberto Presenda - Composer
Erick Rincon - Composer
Guillermo Serrano - A&R
América Sierra - Composer
Jesús Antonio Torres - Composer
Alán Tovar - Composer
Toy Selectah - Producer
Sergio Zavala - Composer

Source:Allmusic

Charts

Weekly charts

Year-end charts

Decade-end charts

Certifications

Release history

References 

2011 debut albums
3Ball MTY albums
Fonovisa Records albums